Georges Bayle ( 22 August 1918 - 13 January 1987) was a French writer.

Biography 
A populist author, he published Du raisin dans le gaz-oil in 1954 dedicated to Jacques Perret with whom Georges Bayle was interned during the Second World War. The plot is located in the corporation of truckers. The novel was adapted by Michel Audiard under the title  directed by Gilles Grangier with Jean Gabin and Jeanne Moreau.

Work

Novels 
1954: Du raisin dans le gaz-oil, Série noire #217
1958: Les Déserteurs, Collection Blanche, Gallimard

Collection of short stories 
1955: Le Pompiste et le Chauffeur, Collection Blanche, Gallimard, prix Cazes 1956

Others 
 Cours de résistance des matériaux appliquée aux machines, 
 Cours de statique graphique, Eyrolles, 1948

Filmography

Adaptation 
 1955: , French film directed by Gilles Grangier, adaptation of the novel Du raisin dans le gaz-oil, with Jean Gabin and Jeanne Moreau

Actor 
 1957: Burning Fuse, French film directed by Henri Decoin, with Raymond Pellegrin and Charles Vanel

Sources 
 , Les Années Série noire vol.1 (1945–1959) Encrage « Travaux » #13, 1992

External links 
 Bibliography on the site of Éditions Gallimard
 

1918 births
20th-century French novelists
20th-century French male writers
French crime fiction writers
1987 deaths